Frank Nickolas Stojack (February 11, 1912 in Wycliffe, British Columbia, Canada – August 30, 1987) was a National Football League player, and a wrestler. He moved to Tacoma, Washington as a child, and considered that his home town.

After graduating from Washington State, Stojack signed with the Brooklyn Dodgers of the National Football League, where he played for two seasons, and also played in the CFL and in 1940 for the Boeing Aero Mechanics semi pro football team. After his American football career was over, he became a professional wrestler. His favorite move was the airplane spin. In 1947 he won the first of four Pacific Coast Junior Heavyweight Championships. In the 1950s he was the light heavyweight champion of the world, defeating Gypsy Joe in Spokane, Washington on April 10, 1953, and holding it until November 30, 1957 when he was stripped of the belt by the NWA. He continued to defend the belt for another year.

Political career
He was elected to the Tacoma City Council in 1953, but continued to wrestle even after his election. At the end of his term on the Tacoma City Council, he ran for, and was elected, Pierce County Sheriff. He served as sheriff until 1962.

Stojack died on August 30, 1987 from Alzheimer's disease.  He was 75 years old. When he died, he left over $300,000 from his estate to the Boys & Girls Club of America.

Championships and accomplishments
 Pacific Northwest Wrestling
NWA World Light Heavyweight Championship (1 time)

External links
 Article about his wrestling career
 dataBase football: statistics

1912 births
1987 deaths
American football offensive linemen
American male professional wrestlers
Canadian emigrants to the United States
Brooklyn Dodgers (NFL) players
People from the Regional District of East Kootenay
Professional wrestlers from Washington (state)
Players of American football from Tacoma, Washington
Washington (state) sheriffs
Washington (state) city council members
Washington State Cougars football players
American athlete-politicians
20th-century American male actors
Neurological disease deaths in the United States
Deaths from Alzheimer's disease
20th-century American politicians